Arthur J. Frawley (c. 1899 – November 1969) was a Massachusetts politician who served as the 41st and 44th Mayors of Lynn, Massachusetts.

Frawley was President of the Lynn City Council when he was named Interim Mayor of Lynn following Albert Cole's resignation. Frawley was elected mayor in 1944, but lost his bid for reelection to Cole, who was still serving in the Pacific at the time of his victory.

Notes

1890s births
1969 deaths
Mayors of Lynn, Massachusetts
20th-century American politicians